Life in Leipzig is a live album by Norwegian pianist Ketil Bjørnstad and guitarist Terje Rypdal recorded in 2005 and released on the ECM label in 2008.

Reception
The AllMusic review by Thom Jurek awarded the album 4½ stars stating "What a contender this record is for one of 2008's finest recordings, and what a solid entry it is in the catalogs of both men".

Track listing
All compositions by Ketil Bjørnstad except as indicated
«The Sea V» (8:01)
«The Pleasure Is Mine, I'm Sure» (5:28) Composed by Terje Rypdal
«The Sea II» (7:29)
«Flotation and Surroundings» (6:42)
«Easy Now» (4:35) Composed by Terje Rypdal
«Notturno (Fragment)» (1:01) Composed by Edvard Grieg
«Alai's Room» (1:38)
«By the Fjord» (3:06)
«The Sea IX» (5:23)
«Le Manfred/Foran Peisen» (5:10) Composed by Terje Rypdal
«The Return Of Per Ulv» (5:20) Composed by Terje Rypdal
Recorded live by MDR, October 14, 2005 during the Leipziger Jazztage.

Personnel
Ketil Bjørnstad - piano
Terje Rypdal - guitar

References

2008 live albums
ECM Records live albums
Ketil Bjørnstad live albums
Terje Rypdal live albums
Albums produced by Manfred Eicher